Vakhtang Stepani Ananyan (26 July 1905 – 4 March 1980) was an Armenian writer. Ananyan was born in Poghoskilisa village, near Dilijan. His first work was published in the journal Pioner in 1927. He was a participant of World War II. He was awarded the Armenian State Prize in 1970. He died in 1980 in Yerevan, where a school is named after him.

See also
List of Armenian SSR State Prize winners

References
Vakhtang Ananyan | Writers.am

1905 births
1980 deaths
20th-century Armenian writers
People from Tavush Province
Recipients of the Order of Friendship of Peoples
Recipients of the Order of the Red Banner of Labour
Soviet military personnel of World War II
Soviet writers